Robert Alan Cashell (April 22, 1938 – February 11, 2020) was an American businessman and politician. He served as the mayor of Reno, Nevada from 2002 to 2014. He served as the 28th lieutenant governor of Nevada from 1983 to 1987 and on the Nevada System of Higher Education Board of Regents from 1979 to 1982. He served as a board member for Station Casinos from June 17, 2011 until his death on February 11, 2020. Cashell was a moderate member of the Republican Party and was a former member of the Democratic Party.

Biography

Because of Bob Cashell's large contributions to UNR students, a football team field house at the University of Nevada was constructed, and named after him. Cashell was a prominent businessman, owning Cashell Enterprises, a hotel/casino company. He bought Bill & Effies, a truck stop, in 1967 and renamed it Boomtown Reno. He sold Boomtown in 1988, after turning the property into a casino/resort.

Cashell later managed several Nevada properties including: Karl's Silver Club (now the defunct Bourbon Square Casino) in Sparks, the Bourbon Street Hotel and Casino (now demolished) in Las Vegas, The Ormsby House in Carson City, and the Avi Resort & Casino for the Avi Indian Tribe in Laughlin. He was a partner in several ventures including: Carson Station (now Max Casino) in Carson City, the Comstock Hotel & Casino (now The Residences at Riverwalk Towers) in Reno and the Holiday Casino (now Harrah's) in Las Vegas. He has also owned several properties including: Winners Inn, Star Casino and Model T Truck Stop in Winnemucca and the Alamo Truck Stop in Sparks. His son, Robert Jr., was a partner in the new ownership of the Fitzgeralds Reno in downtown Reno (which is now the Whitney Peak Hotel). Cashell and his family owned and operate Alamo Truck Plaza in Sparks and Topaz Lodge in Gardnerville.

Cashell died on February 11, 2020, at the age of 81, after being at Saint Mary's Regional Medical Center in Downtown Reno due to suffering heart problems and long-term illnesses.

Footnotes
Kling, Dwayne. The Rise of The Biggest Little City: An Encyclopedic History, 1931–1981. University of Nevada Press (2000)

References

External links

 
 

1938 births
2020 deaths
American casino industry businesspeople
American hoteliers
Businesspeople from Nevada
Catholics from Nevada
Catholics from Texas
Lieutenant Governors of Nevada
Mayors of Reno, Nevada
Nevada Democrats
Nevada Republicans
People from Longview, Texas
Politicians from Carson City, Nevada
Politicians from Reno, Nevada
Stephen F. Austin State University alumni
United States Army Air Forces officers
Military personnel from Texas